The Northern League is a men's football league in north east England. Having been founded in 1889, it is the second-oldest football league in the world still in existence after the English Football League.

It contains two divisions; Division One and Division Two. Division One sits on the ninth tier of the English football league system, five divisions below the Football League. These leagues cover the historic counties of Durham, Northumberland, Cumberland and Yorkshire's North Riding. The champion club of Division One is promoted to the lower division of the Northern Premier League.

History
The Northern league was one of many leagues formed the year after the Football League. In its first season, it consisted of ten clubs that were a mixture of professional and amateur organisations. During its early years, the competition included clubs such as Newcastle United, Middlesbrough and Darlington that would go on to play in the Football League. In 1905, the league split into two divisions, one professional and one amateur. The next year, however, the Northern League made the decision to abolish the professional division and restrict itself to amateur clubs, or at least clubs that claimed to be amateur. 

Between the World Wars and in the early years following World War II, the Northern League's amateur status meant that they and their equivalent in the London area, the Isthmian League, dominated the old FA Amateur Cup. The two Leagues continued to be separate from the professional game which was dominated by the Football League, Southern League and, from 1968, the Northern Premier League.

The Northern League and Isthmian League (with its feeder leagues) continued to claim amateur status right up until, following pressure, amateur status was abandoned by the Football Association in 1974. This left amateur leagues like the Northern to find a place in the overall structure of non-League football. Unlike its southern equivalent, the Isthmian League, who became a feeder to the Alliance Premier League in 1982, the Northern League rejected repeated invitations. Ultimately, the Northern League remained out of the football pyramid until 1991. The league declined throughout the 1980s as its leading clubs defected to other leagues within the football pyramid, such as the Northern Counties East Football League. When the Northern League finally joined the pyramid, it was as a feeder league to the lower division of the Northern Premier League (Level 9).

Since 1995, Northern League clubs have competed for the FA Vase, with some success, having won 10 finals.

The League had an unusual sponsorship deal put in place by Brooks Mileson, owner of the Albany Group, who were its sponsors in 2003. In that year, Mileson announced that he had created a trust which would continue to sponsor the league throughout his lifetime and that of his sons. In 2008, however, the league announced that this sponsorship had come to an end, and it held a raffle to determine its next sponsor. Interested parties were invited to buy a stake in the raffle for £250. The winning stake was held by a local training company and the league was known as the skilltrainingltd Northern League from the 2008–09 season until the 2011–12 season. The league is currently sponsored by dehumidifier manufacturer Ebac.

Level 11 clubs from the North Riding Football League, Northern Football Alliance and Wearside Football League may apply for promotion into the Northern League's (level 10) Second Division.

Current members

Division One

Division Two

Champions

Originally the league comprised a single division.  The champions were as follows:

In 1897, the league briefly split into two divisions.

In 1900, the league reverted to a single division.

In 1905 the league split into two sections, one for professionals and one for amateurs.  This lasted for a single season.

In 1906 the league reverted to a single division, a format retained until 1982.

In 1982 the league added a second division.

League Cup

gg = Golden goal

References

External links
Official website

 
Northern England
1889 establishments in England
9
Sports leagues established in 1889